Addarren Ross (July 13, 1995 – July 20, 2013), known professionally as Lil Snupe, was an American rapper and songwriter from Winnfield, Louisiana signed to American rapper Meek Mill's record label Dream Chasers Records. His death at a young age marked several hip-hop musicians and made him the subject of numerous musical tributes and documentaries.

Early and personal life 
Addarren Ross was born on July 13, 1995 in Jonesboro, Louisiana. Ross was raised in Jonesboro primarily by his mother Denesha Chester. His father, Charlie Brown, was incarcerated for most of his life and at the time of his death, his father was released.

According to testimony by a family friend, Lil Snupe's mother had him when she was approximately 14 or 15 years old. According to accounts by Lil Snupe's mother Denesha Ross, the rapper struggled in school and was expelled three times.

Career

2012–2013 Career beginnings and R.N.I.C 
In 2012, he released his debut mixtape, 16 & Runnin: Tha Mixtape.

According to Lil Snupe, he signed to Meek Mill's record label Dream Chasers Records after sending out a demo to the rapper during his tour stop at the Grambling University in Louisiana. Meek Mill describes coming back from the airport and being approached by Lil Snupe during an interview with Complex magazine: "We were on our way back to the airport, a little kid knocked on the window and gave us a demo. We listened to it, we liked it and he popped up in Philly one day and was hanging with us." In March 2013, he released his single "Nobody Does It Better", a collaboration with his mentor American rapper Meek Mill. In April 2013, he released his mixtape R.N.I.C with appearances from Meek Mill, DJ Khaled, Twinn U, Jay Knoxx, Trae Tha Truth, Tay, Curren$y and Big Poppa.

2013–present: Posthumous releases 
In December 2014, the single "Meant 2 Be" featuring American rapper Boosie Badazz was posthumously released. In January 2015, his posthumous album R.N.I.C 2 (Jonesboro), the sequel to his April 2013 mixtape, was scheduled for release in February of that year. In March 2016, Lil Snupe's team post-humously released his single "Comeback Freestyle" alongside an accompanying music video. In December 2016, a 12-track album titled 16 & Runnin Resurrected with appearances from rappers C'Nyle, Money Bagz, Jemouri, and Raidcal was posthumously released by his family.

Death

Shooting and subsequent arrests

On June 20, 2013, at around 4:00 a.m at the Maplewood Apartments in Winnfield, Louisiana, Lil Snupe was shot and killed. Winn Parish Coroner Investigators pronounced him dead on arrival after paramedics failed to revive him. According to reports, he suffered two gunshot wounds in the torso area. According to a statement released by Louisiana's Winnfield City Police, officers responded to calls of a shooting at the Maplewood Apartments at 1901 South Jones Street at approximately 4:07 a.m. The Associated Press reported that an argument broke out during a video game and culminated in the shooting death of Lil Snupe. On June 26, 2013, 36-year-old Tony Holden, the alleged killer of Lil Snupe turned himself in to authorities. He was booked into the Winnfield city jail on charges of first-degree murder, armed robbery, and illegal possession of a firearm by a convicted felon. On July 3, 2013, 21-year-old Edrick O. Stewart was booked on charges of manslaughter in connection to Lil Snupe's murder. During a November 2022 interview with the Boss Talk 101 podcast, Lil Snupe's mother revealed that the shooting allegedly occurred after a gambling argument involving the video game NBA 2K.

Funeral and tributes 
On June 21, 2013, upon learning the news of Lil Snupe's, Meek Mill posted a series of tweets on his Twitter account expressing his sadness. Later that month, Meek Mill revealed that Rick Ross wanted Lil Snupe on the MMG compilation album Self Made Vol. 3 and shared text messages in which he inquired the rapper about a feature. He ended up being included on the album on the track "Lil Snupe Intro". On June 20, 2013, during an interview with XXL, American rapper Turk spoke about Lil Snupe's death, expressed his sadness revealing that he was friends with the late rapper and that they were about to release a project together. His funeral was held on June 29, 2013, at the Jonesboro-Hodge High School in Jonesboro, Louisiana. According to the HuffPost, hundreds of people were reportedly in attendance. In July 2017, American rapper and Lil Snupe's mentor Meek Mill released the music video to his track "We Ball" featuring Young Thug as a tribute to Lil Snupe. The video features a segment of Lil Snupe freestyle rapping and imagery surrounding the themes of funerals and cemeteries. In April 2021, Lil Snupe's father Charlie Brown, recently released from prison, documented his first visit to his son's grave and mentioned being disappointed that his son didn't have a monument dedicated to him or a headstone blaming rappers Meek Mill and Jay-Z for its condition. In October 2021, Meek Mill released the song "Angels (RIP Lil Snupe)" as a tribute to the late rapper.

Legacy 
In January 2019, hip-hop magazine XXL named Lil Snupe as one of American rapper Asian Doll's lyrical influences. In July 2020, American rapper GlitchMan named Lil Snupe as one of his influences. In September 2021, a documentary titled The Dream Chaser which featured the life and career of Lil Snupe was screened at DocuFest 2021 in Dallas, Texas. In March 2022, during an interview with hip-hop magazine AllHipHop, American rapper NLE Choppa named Lil Snupe when asked about his favorite rappers.

References

See also 
 List of murdered hip hop musicians

21st-century American rappers
1995 births
2013 deaths
African-American male rappers
African-American male songwriters
African-American male singer-songwriters
American hip hop musicians
Deaths by firearm in Louisiana
Rappers from Louisiana
Songwriters from Louisiana
Dream Chasers Records artists
Trap musicians